The 2007 OFC Under-17 Tournament was association football competition in Oceania. It was the 12th edition of the OFC Under 17 Qualifying Tournament which was held in Tahiti from March 21 to March 25, 2007 at the Stade Pater Te Hono Nui. Only four team participated in the tournament; Tahiti, Fiji, New Caledonia and New Zealand. It served as a qualifying tournament to the 2007 FIFA U-17 World Cup.

Solomon Islands were supposed to compete in this tournament but withdrew because of the escalating costs for travel between the Solomon Islands and Tahiti.

Results

By winning, New Zealand qualified to the 2007 FIFA U-17 World Cup.

Winner

Goal scorers
5 goals
 Kosta Barbarouses

2 goals
  Jacob Mathews

 1 goal
  Solomon Getia
  Joshua Taware
  Roy Kayara
  Chris Chettleburgh
  Stephane Faatiarau

References
General
 

Specific

External links
RSSSF, 2007 results

OFC U-17 Championship
Under 17 Tournament
2007
Beach
2007 in youth association football